Yaroslav the Wise was the Grand Prince of Novgorod and Kiev.

Yaroslav the Wise may also refer to:
 Order of Prince Yaroslav the Wise, a Ukrainian order
 Yaroslav Mudriy,  a biographical opera about Yaroslav's life by Heorhiy Maiboroda
 Yaroslav-the-Wise Novgorod State University, a university in Veliky Novgorod, Russia
 Yaroslav Mudry, Russian Neustrashimy-class frigate